Mary Featherstonhaugh Frampton  (16 February 1928 – 28 August 2014), was a British civil servant who worked as clerk in charge of the Serjeant at Arms department in the House of Commons.

Tam Dalyell, writing for her obituary in The Independent, wrote that Frampton was one of "a number of ladies in the Palace of Westminster who would not have been offended had I described them as tanks - heavily armoured Panzers with 88mm guns, at that."

Betty Boothroyd, former Speaker of the House of Commons, wrote about the time that Frampton had in 1978 served a writ on Sir Charles Villiers, and was recognised as a "formidable stickler for the rules".

References

1928 births
2014 deaths
House of Commons of the United Kingdom
British civil servants
Members of the Order of the British Empire